Suzanne Preston Blier is an American art historian who currently serves as Allen Whitehill Clowes Professor of Fine Arts and Professor of African and African American Studies at Harvard University with appointments in both the History of Art and Architecture department and the department of African and African American studies.  She is also a member of the Institute for Quantitative Social Science and a faculty associate at the Weatherhead Center for International Affairs.  Her work focuses primarily on African art, architecture, and culture.

Career
Blier's interest in African art began when she served as a Peace Corps volunteer, from 1969 to 1971 in Savé, a Yoruba center in Dahomey (now Benin Republic).

She began her professorial career at Vassar College serving as a lecturer from 1979 to 1981.  She then spent the following years at Northwestern University as an assistant professor.  In 1983, she began work at her alma mater, Columbia University as an assistant and associate professor before being promoted to full professor. She remained at Columbia until 1993, subsequently transferring to teach at Harvard University. In 1988, she was awarded a Guggenheim Fellowship. Other fellowships have included the American Council of Learned Societies, the National Endowment for the Humanities, and the Institute for Advanced Study in Princeton New Jersey as well as the Getty Research Institute in Los Angeles, Ca. (twice), the Center for Advanced Study in the Visual Arts (CASVA) in Washington, D.C., and the Clark Art Institute in Williamstown, Ma.

Blier's 2019 book, Picasso's Demoiselles, the Untold Origins of a Modern Masterpiece, won the 2020 Robert Motherwell Award for an outstanding publication in the history and criticism of modernism in the arts by the Dedalus Foundation. The citation reads in part: "This book uncovers the previously unknown history of Pablo Picasso's Les Demoiselles d’Avignon, one of the twentieth century's most important, celebrated, and studied paintings....In this profoundly insightful work, Blier fundamentally transforms what we know about this revolutionary and iconic work." The book also was a 2019 Wall Street Journal holiday art book selection and was also honored as one of the best books of 2020 by the Art Forum. In addition the book was a finalist for the 2020 PROSE Award in Art History and Criticism, granted annually in recognition for the very best in professional and scholarly publishing. In 2017,  Blier's book Art and Risk in Ancient Yoruba: Ife History, Politics, and Identity c.1300, won this PROSE award in the same Art History and Criticism category. Her 2004 book, Butabu: Adobe Architecture of West Africa, with photographs by James Morris, was named a "Best of Year" book selection by the Washington Post and was selected by the New York Times Book Review for inclusion in its Holiday Selection that year. Another of Blier's books, The Royal Arts of Africa (1998), a Choice Award winner, has been translated into five languages and is a leading textbook in the field; it was reissued in 2012. Her 1995 book titled African Vodun: Art, Psychology, and Power won the 1997 Charles Rufus Morey Book Prize awarded by the College Art Association for an outstanding publication in art history and was a finalist for the Melville J. Herskovits Award of the African Studies Association. Blier's 1987 book, The Anatomy of Architecture: Ontology and Metaphor in Batammaliba Architectural Expression, won the 1989  Arnold Rubin Outstanding Publication Award presented by ACASA (Arts Council of the African Studies Association). The production of both African Vodun and The Anatomy of Architecture were supported by grants from CAA's Millard Meiss Publication Fund.

Blier's scholarship has appeared in numerous magazines, journals, and edited volumes, including African Arts, Journal of African History, American Journal of Semiotics, Res: Anthropology and Art, and Journal of the Society of Architectural Historiansand The Art Bulletin. In 2018 her chapter, “The African urban past: Historical Perspectives on the Metropolis," appearing in David Adjaye’s African Metropolitan Architecture (2011 and 2018 Rizzoli) was selected for inclusion in the Getty Conservation Institute’s publication: Historic
Cities: Issues in Urban Conservation (Spring 2019), a volume identified as a collection of “classic” texts that have been influential in the history of thinking and practice in the field of urban conservation. In 2015 Homme Blanc/Homme Noir: Impressions d'Afrique which includes Blier's "L'Afrique et l'Occident: une introduction," received the Prix International du Livre d'Art Tribal.

In 2011, two of her articles, "Imaging Otherness in Ivory: African Portrayals of the Portuguese ca. 1492" and "Kings, Crowns and Rights of Succession: Obalufon Arts in Ife and Other Yoruba Centers" were selected for inclusion in The Centennial Anthology of the Art Bulletin comprising the 33 top articles over the journal's 100-year history. Blier was one of only three art historians (along with Meyer Shapiro and Leo Steinberg) to have two articles included. In 2014 Blier published an essay on the importance of African Art in the Art Museum titled "Art Matters."

Blier's interests in mapping led to the creation of the electronic media project, Baobab: Sources and Studies in African Visual Culture (also known as "The Baobab Project").  This project was established at Harvard in 1993 and funded by the Seaver Institute. It represented one of the largest academic studies of African art.  The interactive website included images and an ethnographic database based on GIS, along with narrative-form case studies framed around the questions concerning the social roots of creativity. Topics included the coexistence of traditional art and Islam, African political expansion in relation to style, and art variables in the ancient Yoruba city-state. This Baobab Project led to the creation of AfricaMap in 2007, a website that seeks to bring together the best available cartographic data on the continent in an interactive GIS format.  In 2011, the AfricaMap website, housed at Harvard's Center for Geographic Research, was expanded into WorldMap along with an array of other map types. In 2013, Blier and Peter Bol received a Digital Humanities Implementation Grant Award to enhance this website with their project, "Extending WorldMap to Make It Easier  for Humanists and Others to Find, Use, and Publish Geospatial Information."

Blier is a member of the National Committee for the History of Art and was the 43rd president of the College Art Association (CAA), the national association of Artists, Art Historians, and Designers from 2016-2018. She chairs CAA's Committee of Scholarship and Research (2020-). A member of CAA's board from 2012 to 2018, Blier served as vice president for publications (2013–15) and vice president of Annual Conference (2015–16), and has served on task forces for the development of CAA's Code of Best Practices in Fair Use for the Visual Arts, the Guidelines for the Evaluation of Digital Scholarship in Art and Art History and Guidelines on the Importance of Documenting the Historical Context of Objects and Sites. She also chaired  the 2015-16 task force on the Annual Conference that instituted key changes to this recurring event and chaired the 2016-2018 task force on Governance that spearheaded important changes in the association's name, branding, and Board nomination processes. Blier's involvement in CAA spans several decades. She originally served on the board from 1989 to 1994. She was a member of the Art Bulletin Editorial Board from 2003 to 2007, serving one year as chair, and participated on the juries for CAA's Distinguished Lifetime Achievement Award for Writing on Art (2004–6) and Charles Rufus Morey Book Award (2009–11). Blier also helped to shape CAA's Strategic Plan 2015–2020 and, in her role as vice president, chaired both the Annual Conference Committee and the 2016 task force that brought significant changes to the Annual Conference organization and structure. Blier also has served on the board of directors of the Society of Architectural Historians. In 2022 was elected to the American Academy of Arts and Sciences.

In 2017 she became active in architectural preservation and other efforts in revitalizing Harvard Square, Cambridge, Massachusetts, helping to found the Harvard Square Neighborhood Association that same year as part of this effort. Among the preservation projects taken up by this group are the Harvard Square Subway Kiosk and the Abbott Building, home to the world's only Curious George store. She also led an effort to rezone Harvard Square to promote its revitalization. In 2019 she helped to found the Cambridge Citizens Coalition, a citywide organization focused on government transparency.

In 2018 she was honored with a Yoruba chieftaincy title in Nigeria, Otun Yeye Obalufon, in partial recognition of her scholarship on ancient Ife art. In 2019 Blier received an honorary Doctor of Letters degree from the University of Vermont in recognition of her scholarship in African art and her leadership in online mapping. In 2022 she was honored as a special Yoruba ambassador.

For a profile of Blier's career see "Facing African Art."

Education
Blier attended Burlington High School.  She received her B.A. in art history from the University of Vermont in 1973.  She later received her M.A. (1976) and Ph.D. in art history and archaeology (1981), both from Columbia University.

Works

Beauty and Beast: A Study in Contrasts, 1976, 
Africa's Cross River (Art of the Nigerian Cameroon Border Redefined), 1980,  ISBN B000N90BM0 
Gestures in African Art, 1982, ISBN B0006EBIHE
The Anatomy of Architecture: Ontology and Metaphor in Batammaliba Architectural Expression, 1987, 
African Vodun: Art, Psychology, and Power, 1995, 
Royal Arts Of Africa: The Majesty of Form, 1998, 
A History of Art in Africa, co-author, 2000,   
Butabu: Adobe Architecture of West Africa, 2003, 
Art of the Senses, with Edmund Gaither and Michael Kan, 2004, 
Royal Arts of Africa, 2012, 
Art and Risk in Ancient Yoruba: Ife History, Power, and Identity, c.1300, 2015, 
The Image of the Black in African and Asian Art, with David Bindman and Henry Louis Gates, Jr., 2017, 
Art of Jazz: Form/Performance/Notes, with David Bindman and Vera Ingrid Grant, 2017, 
Asen: Mémoires de fer forgé: Art vodun du Danhomè, 2019, 
Picasso's Demoiselles: The Untold Origins of a Modern Masterpiece, 2019,

References

External links
 Harvard University profile
 IQSS profile

1948 births
Living people
American Africanists
American art historians
University of Vermont alumni
Columbia University alumni
Northwestern University faculty
Columbia University faculty
Harvard University faculty
Women art historians
Historians of African art
American expatriates in Benin
Vassar College faculty
Historians of Yoruba art
Peace Corps volunteers
American women historians
21st-century American women writers
Burlington High School (Vermont) alumni